The 2021 Guangzhou Charge season was the third season of Guangzhou Charge's existence in the Overwatch League and was their first season under head coach Lee "Arachne" Ji-won. After a poor start to the season, the Charge released head coach Lee "Arachne" Ji-won on May 6 and signed Sung-woo "Sungwoo" Hong as their new head coach on June 17. They finished the season with a 5–11 record and did not qualify any postseason matches for the first time in franchise history.

Preceding offseason

Roster changes 
The Charge entered free agency with seven free agents, four of which became free agents due to the Charge not exercising the option to retain the player for another year.

Acquisitions 
The Charge's first offseason acquisition was Park "KariV" Young-seo, a veteran support player coming off of a struggling year with the Toronto Defiant who signed on November 10, 2020. The next day, they signed Kim "Mandu" Chan-hee, a second-year support player who spent most of the 2020 season on the New York Excelsior bench. The Charge announced two more signings in the following two days: Zou "MyKaylee" Zijie, a rookie damage player coming from the Hangzhou Spark Overwatch Contenders academy team Bilibili Gaming, and Choi "ChoiSehwan" Se-hwan, a rookie damage player from Contenders team Element Mystic. The Charge did not sign another player until January 2021; on January 21, they signed Kim "Jihun" Ji-hun, a second-year tank player who did not see much playing time in his rookie season with the London Spitfire.

Departures 
None of the Charge's seven free agents returned, six of which signed with other teams, beginning with support player Kim "Shu" Jin-seo, who signed with the Los Angeles Gladiators on November 9, 2020. Later that month, on November 25, damage player Lee "Happy" Jeong-woo signed with the Houston Outlaws. Five days later, damage player Charlie "Nero" Zwarg signed with the San Francisco Shock. The Charge lost support player Alberto "Neptuno" González Molinillo on December 9 after he signed with the Paris Eternal. Two of the Charge's free agents, damage player Cai "Krystal" Shilong and support player Qi "" Haomiao signed with the Los Angeles Valiant on March 18, 2021. The Charge's final free agent, support player Kim "Chara" Jeong-yeon announced his retirement in the offseason.

Organizational changes  
On October 6, 2020, the Charge released their entire Korean coaching staff, consisting of head coach Cho "J1N" Hyo-jin and assistant coaches Jung "Tydolla" Seung-min and Hong "Sungwoo" Sung-woo. Several weeks later, they signed former San Francisco Shock assistant coach Lee "Arachne" Ji-won as their new head coach for the upcoming season.

Regular season 
The Charge began their 2021 season on April 17, playing against the Shanghai Dragons in the May Melee qualifiers. They were swept in their opener 0–3. After a 1–3 record to start the season, the Charge released head coach Lee "Arachne" Ji-won and assistant coach Kim "Daemin" Dae-min on May 6. Three days later, the Charge released assistant coach Park "Neko" Se-hyeon and signed Zheng "Extra" Jiawen as an assistant coach. The Charge signed Sung-woo "Sungwoo" Hong as their new head coach on June 17.

With a  record, the Charge finished the regular season in second-to-last place in the Eastern region, only ahead of the winless Los Angeles Valiant, marking the first time in franchise history that the team would not qualify for any postseason matches.

Final roster

Standings

Game log

Regular season 

|2021 season schedule

References 

Guangzhou Charge
Guangzhou Charge
Guangzhou Charge seasons